, often called  or TCU for short, is an engineering, environmental and information sciences focused private university located in Tokyo, Japan.

The university has four campuses, the Setagaya campus close to the Tama River at Oyamadai, Setagaya, Tokyo being the main campus. The other three campuses are the Yokohama campus, located in Tsuzuki-ku, Yokohama, the Ōzenji campus, located in Asao-ku, Kawasaki and the Todoroki campus, located in Setagaya, Tokyo.

Gotoh Educational Corporation 
The Gotoh Educational Corporation manages the Tokyo City University Group. Dating its origins to 1939 and the establishment of the Toyoko Girls Commercial School, the educational corporation was founded by Keita Gotō a leading industrialist and founder of the Tokyu Group of companies.

Incorporating the former facilities of Musashi Institute of Technology (founded in 1929), the university was reorganized and renamed Tokyo City University in 2009. The wider Tokyo City University Group now comprises eight private educational schools including Tokyo City University and serves over 12,000 students. Other affiliated schools which share the Tokyo City University name include three senior high schools, two junior high schools, one elementary school and one kindergarten.

Affiliated educational institutions  
 Tokyo City University Junior and Senior High School (Boys)
 Tokyo City University Todoroki Junior and Senior High School (Coed.)
 Tokyo City University Shiojiri High School (Coed.)
 Tokyo City University Elementary School (Coed.)
 Tokyo City University Futako Kindergarten (Coed.)

Tokyo City University schools and laboratories

Undergraduate schools

Faculty of Engineering
Architecture
Civil Engineering
Computer Science and Media Engineering
Electrical and Electronic Engineering
Electronics and Communication Engineering
Environmental Energy Engineering
Mechanical Engineering
Mechanical Systems Engineering
Nuclear Safety Engineering
Systems Information Engineering

Faculty of Environmental and Information Studies
Environmental and Information Studies
Information Ecology Studies

Graduate schools

Engineering
Architecture
Civil Engineering
Cooperative Major in Nuclear Energy
Communication Data Processing Course
Electrical Engineering
Mechanical Engineering
Mechanical Systems Engineering
Systems Information Engineering

Environmental and Information Studies
Environmental and Information Studies

Research laboratories
Advanced Research Laboratories
Research Center for Silicon Nano-Science
Research Center for Energy and Environment Science
Atomic Energy Research Laboratory
Hydrogen Energy Research Center
Advanced Research Center for Energy & Environment

Exchange Programs and Overseas Internships 
The University has a number of established international exchange and overseas internship programs. Prominent among which is an exchange partnership with Edith Cowan University in which up to 300 TCU undergraduates participate in extended study programs in Perth, Australia each year.

Facilities

Campuses

Setagaya Campus

Yokohama Campus 
Yokohama Campus located in Ko-Hoku New Town, Tsuzuki-ku, Yokohama. 5 minutes walk from Nakagawa Station, Blue Line.

Todoroki campus

References

External links
 The official TCU web site

Educational institutions established in 1929
Private universities and colleges in Japan
Universities and colleges in Tokyo
Research institutes in Japan
Technical universities and colleges in Japan
Engineering universities and colleges in Japan
Universities and colleges in Kanagawa Prefecture
Universities and colleges in Yokohama
Tokyu Group
1929 establishments in Japan